1996 is the seventh studio album by Eighteen Visions. It is a covers album surprise-released on July 9, 2021, and the band's first album in four years following XVIII (2017), marking the longest gap between two studio albums in the band's career without breaking up. According to frontman James Hart, the album is a "collection of 90s hardcore and hard rock songs from bands that helped shape Eighteen Visions and our style".

Track listing

Personnel
James Hart – lead vocals, lyrics on "1996"
Keith Barney – guitars, piano, keyboards, backing vocals
Josh James – guitars, bass, backing vocals
Trevor Friedrich – drums, percussion

References

Eighteen Visions albums
2021 albums
Self-released albums